Igor Alexandrovich Kononov is a Russian ice speedway world champion.   

On three occasions Kononov has finished runner-up in the Individual Ice Speedway World Championship title in 2011, 2017 and 2021. During the 2021 Championship he was in the lead on the last lap of the race-off with Dinar Valeev but hit a rut approaching the last two bends which allowed Valeev to overtake and claim the title for himself.

He is a two times team world champion after winning the Team Ice Racing World Championship title with Russia in 2017 and 2020.

References

1987 births
Living people
Russian speedway riders
Ice Speedway World Champions